The 1997 Iraqi Perseverance Cup was the 2nd edition of the Iraqi Super Cup. The match was contested between the Baghdad rivals, Al-Quwa Al-Jawiya and Al-Zawraa, at Al-Shaab Stadium in Baghdad. It was played on 16 May 1997 to bring an end to the 1996–97 season. Al-Quwa Al-Jawiya won the game 3–1 to become the first Iraqi team to win the domestic quadruple.

Match

Details

References

External links
 Iraq Football Association

Football competitions in Iraq
1996–97 in Iraqi football
Iraqi Super Cup